Calanthe vestita is a species of orchid. It is widespread throughout much of Southeast Asia from Assam to New Guinea including Thailand, Indonesia, Malaysia and the Philippines.

References

External links

vestita
Orchids of Indonesia
Orchids of Thailand
Orchids of the Philippines
Orchids of New Guinea
Plants described in 1833